Megalostrata is a genus of corinnid sac spiders first described by Ferdinand Karsch in 1880.

Species
 it contains four species:
Megalostrata bruneri (Bryant, 1936) – Cuba
Megalostrata depicta (O. Pickard-Cambridge, 1895) – Mexico
Megalostrata monistica (Chamberlin, 1924) – Mexico
Megalostrata raptor (L. Koch, 1866) (type) – Mexico to Panama

References

Araneomorphae genera
Corinnidae
Taxa named by Ferdinand Karsch